James Patrick Fitzgerald (March 7, 1907 – September 23, 1978) was an American football player. He played college football for Holy Cross and in the National Football League (NFL) as a center for the Staten Island Stapletons during the 1930 and 1931 seasons. He appeared in 21 NFL games, 14 as a starter. The James Fitzgerald Elementary school was named after him in Waltham, MA.

References

1907 births
1978 deaths
Staten Island Stapletons players
Players of American football from Massachusetts
Holy Cross Crusaders football players